CMT Crossroads is an American television program broadcast on CMT that pairs country music artists with musicians from other music genres such as alternative rock, pop, R&B, Rock, soul and more, frequently trading off performing one another's songs, one cover song and also dueting on some numbers.

History
Crossroads premiered on January 13, 2002, and there have been seventy-six episodes to date. Some artists have appeared in more than one episode such as Kenny Chesney, Martina McBride, Luke Bryan, Brad Paisley, Keith Urban, Sara Evans, Emmylou Harris, Jennifer Nettles, John Mayer, etc.

The impact of the show has built many successful relationships between the artists who performed together:

Because of their 2002 appearance on Crossroads, Sheryl Crow and Willie Nelson became very good friends, performing and recording together many times since, most recently on Crow's 2019 album Threads.
After appearing together on Crossroads in 2007, Kelly Clarkson and Reba McEntire announced a joint tour titled 2 Worlds 2 Voices, which subsequently sold out all fifteen of its initial dates, grossing over seven million dollars and prompting a second leg to be announced. Clarkson later married McEntire's former stepson, leading to Clarkson's subsequent experimentation with country music, performing with Vince Gill, Jason Aldean, Trisha Yearwood and Dan + Shay, as well as appearing as part of a tribute to McEntire alongside Miranda Lambert. McEntire went on to guest on Clarkson's 2013 Wrapped in Red album and, in turn, Clarkson guested on McEntire's 2015 Love Somebody and 2017 Sing It Now albums.
Jimmy Buffett appeared on "Knee Deep", a song from Zac Brown Band's 2010 album You Get What You Give following their Crossroads episode.
"Golden", a song from Lady Antebellum's album of the same name was re-recorded with Stevie Nicks following their collaboration on CMT Crossroads and was released as a single. The group subsequently performed with Nicks at the Academy of Country Music Awards. Lady Antebellum then provided backing vocals on "Blue Water", a track from her 24 Karat Gold album.
Following their collaboration on Crossroads, Steven Tyler invited Carrie Underwood to guest on "Can't Stop Lovin' You", a track on Aerosmith's 2012 album Music from Another Dimension!
After recording their Crossroads episode, Katy Perry decided to bring Kacey Musgraves onto her Prismatic World Tour as an opening act.
Following their collaboration during a 2018 episode of CMT Crossroads, Shawn Mendes co-wrote "Someone I Used to Know" with the Zac Brown Band.

Episodes

Appearances
4
Sara Evans

3
Luke Bryan
Kenny Chesney
Sheryl Crow
Emmylou Harris
Charles Kelley (two alongside Lady A)
Martina McBride
Willie Nelson

2

Jason Aldean
Breland
Luke Combs
Florida Georgia Line
For King & Country 
Billy Gibbons 
Mickey Guyton
Jamey Johnson
Alison Krauss
Lady A
Lynyrd Skynyrd
John Mayer
John Mellencamp
Jennifer Nettles 
Brad Paisley
Robert Plant
Bonnie Raitt
Rascal Flatts
LeAnn Rimes
Darius Rucker
Keith Urban
Joe Walsh
Brett Young
Zac Brown Band

See also
CMT Cross Country
CMT Invitation Only

References

External links
 CMT Crossroads website

2000s American music television series
2010s American music television series
2020s American music television series
2002 American television series debuts
CMT (American TV channel) original programming
English-language television shows